Dervish is an Irish traditional music group from County Sligo, Ireland which has been described by BBC Radio 3 as "an icon of Irish music". They were formed in 1989 by Liam Kelly, Shane Mitchell, Martin McGinley, Brian McDonagh, and Michael Holmes and have been fronted by singer Cathy Jordan since 1991. They represented Ireland in the final of the Eurovision Song Contest 2007, singing a song written by John Waters and Tommy Moran. In 2019 they released an album on the US Rounder Records label called The Great Irish Song Book featuring a selection of classic Irish songs sung by a number of well known singers including Steve Earle, Andrea Corr, Vince Gill, Kate Rusby, Imelda May, Rhiannon Giddens, The Steel Drivers, Brendan Gleeson, Abigail Washburn, and Jamey Johnson. In 2019 they received a lifetime achievement award from the BBC.

History 
The band was originally called The Boys of Sligo; an album under this title, with Martin McGinley on fiddle, and with no vocals, was released by Sound Records (SUN CD1).

In 1991 the band were joined by Roscommon-born singer Cathy Jordan and fiddle player Shane McAleer. Dervish's first album, Harmony Hill, was released in 1993. In 1994 their second album, Playing with Fire, was released. In 1996 Dervish released At the End of the Day.

Their fourth album, Live in Palma, was recorded in front of a live audience in 1997. In 1998 McAleer left the band and was replaced by Sligo musician Séamie O'Dowd and fiddle player Tom Morrow. Dervish's fifth album, Midsummer's Night, was released in 1999.  In 2001 Dervish released Decade, a compilation of tracks from their first five albums. In 2003 they released Spirit, followed by A Healing Heart in 2006.

Eurovision Song Contest 2007
Dervish performed as the Irish entry for the Eurovision Song Contest 2007. They finished last (with five points which were awarded to them by the Albanian back-up jury because of a failed televote), for their performance of "They Can't Stop The Spring".

2012 Boycott of Israel
  
In the Spring of 2012, Dervish was one of two Irish bands that canceled heavily advertised concerts in Israel citing a cultural boycott of Israel. The band's lead vocalist, Cathy Jordan, stated "it was very naïve of me to think our motives would not be misunderstood and misrepresented. So much so it started an avalanche of negativity which has made it impossible for us to make the trip regardless of our motives." Jordan added that "Although I was aware of the concerns with our proposed visit to Israel, I wasn’t quite prepared for the extent of the venom directed at us." Irish Justice Minister Alan Shatter accused the Ireland Palestine Solidarity Campaign (IPSC) of "cyberbullying" Dervish into withdrawing from the concerts. IPSG National co-ordinator Kevin Squires stated that the organization had directed its supporters to target Dervish's website, although he denied Jordan's claim that there was any "venom" directed towards the band.

Discography
The Boys of Sligo (1989)
 Paddy's Trip to Scotland/The New Rigged Ship/Larry Redican's Bow
 The Dolphin/The Clapton Jigs
 Thos Byrnes/The Man Of Aran
 Jackson's/The Cliffs of Glencolumbkille
 The Sligo Set: Martin Wynne's/Lad O’Beirne's/McDermott's
 The Raphoe Reel/The Chestnut Tree
 The Boys Of Sligo/Monaghan Twig
 The World's End Set
 Eddie Kelly's Jigs
 Unknown Reel/Return From Camden Town
 The Key Of The Convent/Tommy People's Reel
 The Dancing Bear/Oreaga
 Walsh's Fancy/The Congress/Spoil the Dance

Harmony Hill (1993)
 Apples in Winter
 Hills of Greenmore
 The Green Fields of Miltown
 Bellaghy Fair
 The Ploughman
 The Green Mountain
 Welcome Poor Paddy Home
 Jig C Jig
 The Fair Maid
 Virginia Set
 A Stór Mo Chroí
 Slides & Reels

Playing with Fire (1995)
 Buckley's Fancy
 Molly And Johnny
 Last Nights Fun
 Wheels Of The World
 Maire Mor
 I Buried My Wife
 The Hungry Rock
 Cailin Rua
 Ash Plant Set
 Peigin Mo Chroi
 The Game Of Love
 Willie Lennox
 Let Down The Blade

At the End Of The Day (1996)
 Touching Cloth (Reels)
 Ar Éirinn Ní Neosfainn Cé Hí (Song)
 Jim Coleman's (Mazurka & Reels)
 An Spailpín Fánach (Song)
 Packie Duignan's (Jigs)
 Lone Shanakyle (Song)
 Drag Her Round The Road (Reels)
 Peata Beag (Song)
 The Trip To Sligo Set (Reels)
 Sile Ni Ghadhra (Song)
 The Kilavill Set (Jigs)
 I Courted A Wee Girl
 Josefin's Waltz (Dervish & Väsen)
 Eileen McMahon

Live in Palma (1997)
 Packie Duignan's (Jigs)
 An Spailpín Fánach (Song)
 Slow Reels
 Sheila Nee Iyer (Song)
 The Trip To Sligo (Reels)
 The Hungry Rock
 Ar Éirinn Ní Neosfainn Cé Hí (Song)
 Molly And Johnny (Song)
 The Green Mountain
 I Courted A Wee Girl/Josefin's Waltz (Song)
 Drag Her Round The Road (Reels)
 Máire Mhór (Song)
 I Buried Me Wife and Danced On Top Of Her (Jigs)
 The Hills Of Greanmore (Song)
 The World's End (Reels)
 Peata Beag (Song)
 Pheigín Mo Chroi (Song)
 Jim Coleman's (Muzurka and Reels)
 Happy Birthday To Felip
 Edward by Lough Éirn's Shore (Song)
 Killavil Jigs
 Allelu na Gnamha

Midsummer's Night (1999)
 Midsummer's Night
 Seán Bháin
 Tenpenny Bit
 The Banks of Sweet Viledee
 Palmer's Gate
 Érin Grá mo Chroí
 Lark on the Strand
 Cairns Hill
 There was a Maid in her Father's Garden
 Abbeyfeale Set
 An T-Úll
 Bold Doherty
 Out on the Road
 Red-haired Mary

Decade (2001)
 The Kilavill Set
 Molly and Johnny
 The Lark on the Strand
 The Hills of Greanmore
 The Worlds End
 Apples in Winter
 Peigín mo chroí
 Josefin's Waltz
 An Spailpín Fánach
 The Hungry Rock
 The Banks of the Sweet Viledee
 Palmer's Gate
 Ar Éirinn Ní Neosfainn Cé Hí
 Jim Coleman's

Spirit (2003)
 John Blessings
 An Rógaire Dubh/Na Ceannabháin Bhána/Páidín O Raifeartaí
 Father Jack
 Fair-Haired Boy
 Siesta Set
 Soldier Laddie
 Beauties of Autumn
 The Lag's Song
 Boots of Spanish Leather
 O'Raghailligh's Grave
 Swallows Tail
 The Cocks Are Crowing
 Whelans: Trounsdells Cross, Whelans

A Healing Heart (2005)
 I Courted a Wee Girl / Josefin's Waltz
 A Stór Mo Croí
 Boots of Spanish Leather
 Willie Lennox
 Erin Grá mo Chroi
 Ar Éirinn Ní Neosfainn Cé Hí
 The Fairhaired Boy
 Lone Shanakyle
 I Hope You Still Dance
 Josefin's Waltz

Travelling Show (2007)
 Gypsies, Tramps and Thieves
 The Coolea Jigs
 My Bride and I
 The Cat She Went A-Hunting
 The Bealtine Set
 Grainne
 Heading Home
 The Queen and The Soldier
 The Masters Return
 Lord Levett
 The Jolly Tinker
 Crucan Na bPaiste

The Thrush in the Storm (2013)
 The Green Gowned Lass
 Baba Chonraoí
 Maggie's Lilt
 The Lover's Token
 The Rolling Wave
 Shanagolden
 The Corner House
 The Banks of the Clyde
 Handsome Polly-O
 Harp and Shamrock
 Snoring Biddy
 The Thrush in the Storm

Celebration!! 1989-2014 (2014)
 Midsummer's Night
 Snoring Biddy
 The Coolea Jigs
 Bold Doherty
 Killavil Jigs
 The Ploughman
 Maggie's Lilt
 Cailin Rua
 Packie Duighnan's
 Boots of Spanish leather
 Buckley's Fancy
 Lord Levett
 The Swallow's Tail
 Red Haired Mary
 Welcome Poor Paddy Home

The Great Irish Song Book (2019)
 The Rambling Irishman
 There's Whiskey in the Jar
 Molly Malone
 The Galway Shawl
 She Moved through the Fair
 The Rocky Road to Dublin
 Down by the Sally Gardens
 On Raglan Road
 Dónal Óg
 The Fields of Athenry
 The May Morning Dew
 The West Coast of Clare
 The Parting Glass

References

Bibliography
 Neal Walters & Brian Mansfield (ed.) (1998) MusicHound Folk: The Essential Album Guide, p. 217-8), (Dervish entry, page 217, Dervish entry, page 218).

External links

 

Eurovision Song Contest entrants for Ireland
Eurovision Song Contest entrants of 2007
Celtic music groups
Irish folk musical groups
Musical groups established in 1989
Musical groups from County Sligo